Muribaculum intestinale  is a strictly anaerobic bacterium from the genus of Muribaculum which has been isolated from the caecal content of a mouse in Zurich in Switzerland.

References

External links
Type strain of Muribaculum intestinale at BacDive -  the Bacterial Diversity Metadatabase

Bacteroidia
Bacteria described in 2016